The George Washington University School of Medicine and Health Sciences (abbreviated as GW Medical School or SMHS) is the professional medical school of the George Washington University, in Washington, D.C. SMHS is one of the most selective medical schools in the United States based on the number of applicants.

Rankings
U.S. News & World Report ranks GW Medicine as having the third best physician assistant program, the 40th best physical therapy program, as tied for the 60th best research medical school, and as tied for the 68th best primary care medical school in the United States. The George Washington University Hospital has routinely served the medical needs of presidents of the United States and members of the U.S. Congress.

GW Medicine is one of the most selective medical schools in the U.S. based on the number of applicants (rather than based on GPA and MCAT scores), with the fifth-lowest acceptance rate of any medical school in the United States. GW SMHS experienced a rise in the number of applications, to 14,649 applications in 2012. It receives more applications each year than any other allopathic medical school in the country. The school has more than 700 medical students currently enrolled in its Doctor of Medicine (MD) program.

Academics

The School of Medicine and Health Sciences contains a variety of programs such as the M.D. Program, the Physician Assistant program, and the Physical Therapy program. Multiple nobel laureates have been affiliated with SMHS, including Ferid Murad, Vincent du Vigneaud, and Julius Axelrod. The school maintains numerous research centers and institutes. Among the most notable are The Dr. Cyrus and Myrtle Katzen Cancer Research Center, the GW Heart and Vascular Institute, the McCormick Genomic and Proteomic Center, the W.M. Keck Institute for Proteomics Technology and Applications, The Rodham Institute, Washington Institute of Surgical Endoscropy, the Ronald Reagan Institute of Emergency Medicine, the GW Institute for Neuroscience, and the GW HIV/AIDS Institute.

The Himmelfarb Health Sciences Library is the academic library for GW SMHS.

International Medicine Program
The International MD Program was developed by the Office of International Medicine Programs at GW in response to the great demand for U.S.-educated physicians abroad. Differences in educational/teaching styles, language, and culture may present further obstacles to international students who apply to American programs. The International MD Program is designed to facilitate international students who wish to practice medicine, and to further GW's mission to improve the health and well-being of communities beyond its locale by promoting the exchange of knowledge across cultures.

Residency training for graduates of non-U.S. medical schools and colleges is also provided by GW SMHS.

Other programs
Other programs include clinical laboratory sciences and administration training. The school also offers a nurse practitioner program and a physician assistant program. The school offers many Early Selection options through participating universities, as well as a seven-year accelerated program.

Admissions

Admission to the School of Medicine and Health Sciences is the most competitive of the George Washington University's graduate programs. For the 2022-2023 application cycle which matriculated its class of 2026 in the Fall of 2022, about 181 accepted students matriculated out of a competitive pool of 15,216 applicants who all applied to The George Washington University School of Medicine and Health Sciences M.D. Program. Of the 15,216 applicants, only about 800 were interviewed, and just over 300 students were accepted with 181 matriculating. The George Washington University School of Medicine has an acceptance rate of 1.09% for students matriculating to School of Medicine in the Class of 2026. The George Washington University was the 4th most applied to medical school in the country for the 2022 matriculating year and was ranked as the 7th most selective medical school in the United States based on the number of applicants.

The School of Medicine had the lowest admissions rate in the United States in 2016 and 2013 based on the number of applicants (1.1 percent during 2016 admission cycle) according to U.S. News & World Report. For the MD class entering in 2019, a little more than 1,000 applicants were interviewed out of a total number of 12,057 applicants. Approximately 300 individuals were accepted, with 184 enrolling. Students had an average GPA of 3.71, and a mean MCAT score of 512.8. Among the 46 medical schools with the highest MCAT scores, the typical student had an average score of 517, while the average MCAT for matriculants of all medical schools was 511.5.
Four out of every ten students holds an undergraduate degrees in the arts, humanities, or social sciences. A unique aspect of the school is the Practice of Medicine (POM) course that spans the entire length of a medical student's education. GW was one of the first in the country to place students in clinical settings from the start of their medical school experience.

Research
GW SMHS is home to many research centers and institutes. Among them are the Dr. Cyrus and Myrtle Katzen Cancer Research Center, the GW Cancer Center, the Rodham Institute, the Institute for Biomedical Sciences, and the GW Institute for Neuroscience.

The Health Sciences Research Commons 
Health Sciences Research Commons (HSRC) is an online repository for GWU School of Medicine and Health Sciences staff and faculty research articles and other publications.

Affiliations

Children's National Medical Center

The Department of Pediatrics within SMHS is housed at Children's National Medical Center. In addition, the SMHS and Children's National partner on a variety of projects and initiatives.

Medical Faculty Associates

The school has a partnership with the George Washington University Medical Faculty Associates who have over 800 physicians on staff that provide teaching and professional services to the community. The staff of GW MFA are also academic clinical faculty of the SMHS.

Controversy
In 2008, the LCME or Liaison Committee on Medical Education put the George Washington University Medical School on accreditation probation, citing a number of issues. While declining to publish the entire list, among the problems acknowledged by GW were its outdated system of managing its curriculum, the curriculum itself, high levels of student debt, student mistreatment, and inadequate study and lounge space for its students. Significantly, in 2008, GWU was the only medical school (among 129 LCME accredited institutions) to be placed on probation and the first such in fifteen years.

GW implemented a plan to rectify these problems. Its probationary status was lifted in February 2010. Subsequently, the two top GWU medical school administrators were forced to resign over the alleged conflicts of interest.

Notable people

Notable alumni

Notable faculty

References

External links
 

Colleges and Schools of The George Washington University
Medical schools in Washington, D.C.
Educational institutions established in 1824
Medical research institutes in Washington, D.C.
Health sciences schools in the United States